The Walburgisgymnasium is a private secondary school located in Menden (Sauerland), Germany with 1,200 pupils and 78 teachers. The order is based in Bestwig.

History
It was founded as a girls' gymnasium in 1919, and became co-educational by having its first intake of boys in 1975.

Community

Teacher
Director: Sr. Maria Thoma Dikow SMMP
Dr. Udo Volkmann
Marion Hankel, Herbert Heinrichs
Manfred Wegener

Parents
Chairman:

Friends
Chairman: Reinhold Jacobs (Förderverein)

External links
http://www.walburgisgymnasium.de 

Gymnasiums in Germany
Private schools in Germany
Schools in North Rhine-Westphalia
Menden (Sauerland)
Educational institutions established in 1919
1919 establishments in Germany